Leighton Morgan (born 16 February 1981) is a New Zealand former cricketer. He played first-class cricket for Otago and Wellington between 2001 and 2010.

See also
 List of Otago representative cricketers

References

External links
 

1981 births
Living people
New Zealand cricketers
Otago cricketers
Wellington cricketers
Cricketers from Wellington City